Editorial Ivrea is an Argentine manga and comics publisher that publishes in Argentina, Spain and Finland. They also published Lazer, a magazine which was specialized in anime, comics, manga, series and other media. The magazine has an acid humor and has also organized parties in Argentina. On June 15, 2008, they started Lazer Royale, in which they made Concourse for cosplayers, and Tokyo Weekend on July 27, 2008. Famous singers Nobuo Yamada and Ricardo Cruz also appeared during the event. During August 2009, Ivrea announced the end of Lazers publication due to copyright issues with Shueisha and Shogakukan regarding the use of images in the magazine.

Editorial Ivrea was founded in 1997 in Argentina, and since then, they have released several comics. Initially, they published manga volumes of 200 pages and others of 100 pages, which are half of the tankōbon format. Later, they started releasing manwhua and Argentinian comics, including EL NEGRO BLANCO. The Spanish publisher specializes in comics focused on different ages and has also released South American and European books, as well as artbooks from manga series.

Titles

Shonen

 .hack//Legend of the Twilight (not in Spain)
 Ai Kora
 Akame ga Kill!
 Angelic Layer
 Aoi Destruction!
 ArchLord
 Aria
 Bakuman (not in Spain)
 Battle Club
 Bimbogami ga!
 Black Clover (not in Spain)
 BLEACH (not in Spain)
 BLOOD+ (not in Spain)
 Blue Exorcist (not in Spain)
 Blue Flag
 Brain Powerd
 Chainsaw Man
 Change 123
 Code Geass
 Creature!
 D.Gray-man
 Deadman Wonderland
 Demon Slayer (not in Spain)
 Desert Coral
 DNA² (not in Spain)
 Dr. Rian ga miteageru
 Dragon Ball (not in Spain)
 Dragon Ball Super (not in Spain)
 Dr. Stone (only in Spain)
 ËDENs BOwY
 Elemental Gelade
 Erementar Gerad: Aozora no Senki
 Frame Saber
 Fullmetal Alchemist
 Goshimeidesu!
 Hatsukoi Limited
 Highschool of the Dead (not in Spain)
 Hungry Heart: Wild Striker
 I"s (not in Spain)
 Ichigo 100%
 Ikki Tousen
 Jaco the Galactic Patrolman
 JoJo's Bizarre Adventure
 Kaguya-sama: Love Is War (only in Spain)
 Katte ni Kaizō
 Kekkaishi
 Koi Koi Seven
 Legend of Himiko
 Lilim Kiss
 Linebarrels of Iron
 Lost Universe
 Lost+Brain
 Macross 7 Trash
 Mahouromatic
 Mahoutsukai tai!
 MÄR
 MÄR Omega
 Matantei Loki
 Matantei Loki Ragnarok
 Medaka Box
 Midori Days
 Mirai Nikki
 Mixim 11
 MxO
 Neon Genesis Evangelion (not in Spain)
 Neon Genesis Evangelion: Shinji Ikari Raising Project (not in Spain)
 Nisekoi
 Peacemaker Kurogane
 Shinsengumi Imon Peacemaker
 Ranma ½ (not in Spain)
 Rurouni Kenshin (not in Spain)
 Saber Marionette J
 Saint Seiya (not in Spain)
 Saint Seiya Episode.G (not in Spain)
 Saint Seiya: Next Dimension
 Saint Seiya: The Lost Canvas (not in Spain)
 Seikon no Qwaser
 Shaman King (not in Spain)
 Slam Dunk
 Slam Dunk
 Slayers
 Slayers
 Tachibana
 The Candidate for Goddess
 The Law of Ueki
 The Melancholy of Suzumiya Haruhi
 The Melancholy of Suzumiya Haruhi (novels)
 The Promised Neverland
 To-Love-Ru: Darkness
 To-Love-Ru
 Trinity Blood
 Video Girl Ai (not in Spain)
 Welcome to the N.H.K.
 Wild School (Kim Jeong-Han)
 World of Narue
 Yakitate!! Japan
 YuYu Hakusho

Shojo

 Akuma na Eros
 Cardcaptor Sakura
 D.N.Angel
 Fruits Basket (not in Spain)
 Fushigi Yûgi (not in Spain)
 Haou Airen
 Honey x Honey Drops
 Junai Strip
 Karekano (not in Spain)
 Koakuma Cafe
 Love Celeb
 Marmalade Boy (not in Spain)
 Midnight Children
 Miyuki-chan in Wonderland 
 Motto Oshiete!
 Nabi (Yeon-Joo Kim)
 Nana (not in Spain)
 Neon Genesis Evangelion: Girlfriend of Steel 2nd (not in Spain)
 Paradise Kiss
 SEX=LOVE2
 Suki wo Choudai
 Vampire Crisis
 We Were There
 Fullmetal Alchemist (not in Spain)
 Fairy Tail (not in Spain)
 Tokyo Ghoul (not in Spain)
 Erased (not in Spain)
 Inuyashiki (not in Spain)

Seinen

 Another
 Bar Limelight
 Baron Gong Battle
 Battle Royale
 Battle Royale II
 Blood Rain
 Blood: The Last Vampire 2000 (not in Spain)
 Btooom!
 Dark Water
 Daydream
 Desire (Kenichi Kotani)
 EDEN
 Elfen Lied
 Freesia
 Gantz (not in Spain)
 Go! Go! Heaven
 Godeath
 Heaven's Prison
 Hellsing
 Kaze no Sho
 Kokkuri-san Planchette
 Moonlight Mile
 Ōsama Game
 Puella Magi Madoka Magica
 Real
 The Ring
 Shigurui
 Sundome
 Tenjho Tenge
 Terra Formars
 Vagabond
 Yakuza Girl
 Yuzu Bunko Club
 Zetman
 Oyasumi Punpun(not in Spain)

Comics USA & European (only in Argentina)

 Teenage Mutant Ninja Turtles
 Fear Agent
 X-Files Season 10
 The Maxx
 Sin City
 300
 Life Zero
 Sunstone
 Oink
 James Bond

References

External links
 
 Ivrea´s official blog

1997 establishments in Argentina
Argentine comics
1997 in comics
Publishing companies established in 1997
Manga distributors
Manhwa distributors
Mass media in Buenos Aires
Argentine companies established in 1997